Thor's scaldfish (Arnoglossus thori) is a species of bottom feeder benthic fish belonging to the family Bothidae (lefteye flounder). It is widespread in the Eastern Atlantic from Ireland to Sierra Leone and Cape Verde, and also known from the western Mediterranean and Black Sea. It is a marine, subtropical, demersal fish, up to 18 cm long.

References

External links
 

Thor's scaldfish
Fish of the East Atlantic
Fish of the Mediterranean Sea
Fish of the Black Sea
Marine fauna of West Africa
Marine fish of Europe
Thor's scaldfish